Oswald "Owa" H. Johnson (January 16, 1912 – July 30, 1993) was an American businessman and politician.

Born in Black River Falls, Wisconsin, Johnson received his doctorate degree from Carroll University and owned an insurance business in Black River Falls. He served on the Black River Falls Common Council and was a Republican. In 1943, Johnson served in the Wisconsin State Assembly. He died at his home in Black River Falls in 1993.

Notes

External links

1912 births
1993 deaths
People from Black River Falls, Wisconsin
Carroll University alumni
Businesspeople from Wisconsin
Wisconsin city council members
20th-century American businesspeople
20th-century American politicians
Republican Party members of the Wisconsin State Assembly